The 1986 European Tour was the 15th official season of golf tournaments known as the PGA European Tour.

The season was made up of 26 tournaments counting for the Order of Merit and several non-counting "Approved Special Events".

The Order of Merit was won by Spain's Seve Ballesteros, who won six tournaments during the season.

Changes for 1986
There were several changes from the previous season, with the addition of the Epson Grand Prix of Europe Matchplay Championship and the PLM Open; the return of the Scottish Open, as the Glasgow Open was rebranded, and the loss of the GSI L'Equipe Open.

Before the season started, the Tunisian Open, scheduled as the opening event opposite the Masters Tournament, was cancelled after sponsors withdrew funding for the event.

Order of Merit minimum tournaments
In 1986 the minimum number of tournaments needed to qualify for the Order of Merit was increased from seven to nine.

Schedule
The following table lists official events during the 1986 season.

Unofficial events
The following events were sanctioned by the European Tour, but did not carry official money, nor were wins official.

Order of Merit
The Order of Merit was based on prize money won during the season, calculated in Pound sterling.

Awards

See also
List of golfers with most European Tour wins

Notes

References

External links
1986 season results on the PGA European Tour website
1986 Order of Merit on the PGA European Tour website

European Tour seasons
European Tour